This is a list of seasons completed by the Canisius Golden Griffins football team formerly of the National Collegiate Athletic Association (NCAA) Division I-AA. Canisius' first football team was fielded in 1918.

Canisius originally competed as a football independent, before competing for years as a member of the Western New York Little Three Conference with local Catholic rivals Niagara and St. Bonaventure. The team moved to Division III in the 1970s, before joining the I-AA's Metro Atlantic Athletic Conference in 1993. At the conclusion of the 2002 season, the Canisius football program was discontinued, along with seven other school athletic programs, as part of an effort to overhaul and streamline the school's athletic department.

Seasons

References

Canisius

Canisius Golden Griffins football seasons